The R415 road is a regional road in Ireland, which runs north-south from its junction with the R403 in Allenwood to the R448 (formerly the N9) at Crookstown, passing through Kildare town, and crossing the N78 between Kilcullen and Athy. The route is entirely within County Kildare.

Route 

The official description of the R415 from the Roads Act 1993 (Classification of Regional Roads) Order 2012  reads:

R415: Allenwood Cross — Kildare — Crookstown Upper, County Kildare

Between its junction with R403 at Allenwood Cross and its junction with R445 at Dublin Street in the town of Kildare via Derrymullen, Kilmeage, Allen Cross, Milltown, Rathbride Cross, Little Curragh, Whitesland East; Station Road and Market Square in the town of Kildare all in the county of Kildare (map of this 16.8 km segment)

and

between its junction with R445 at Claregate Street in the town of Kildare and its junction with R418 at Fontstown Lower via Modus Media Road in the town of Kildare; Greyabbey, Newtown Cross, Kingsbog, Nurney, Mylerstown Cross and Boley Cross roads all in the county of Kildare (map of this 14.6 km segment)

and

between its junction with the R418 at Fontstown Upper and its junction with R448 at Crookstown Upper via Ballyadams Cross, Boleybeg and Crookstown Lower all in the county of Kildare map of this 7.9 km segment).

See also 
Roads in Ireland
National primary road
National secondary road

References 

Regional roads in the Republic of Ireland
Roads in County Kildare